The Ministry of Regional Development was a central executive body in the Government of Kazakhstan, which carried out coordination in the field of formation and implementation of state policy in the regional development, entrepreneurship support, including the activities of social and enterprise corporations.

The Ministry was formed on 16 January 2013 by the decree of the President of Kazakhstan #466 "On the further improvement of the public administration system of the Republic of Kazakhstan".

On 14 August 2014, the Ministry was reorganized into the Committee for Construction, Housing and Communal Services and Land Management which is led by Ministry of National Economy.

References

Regional
2013 establishments in Kazakhstan
Ministries established in 2013